Chahar Cheshmeh (also Romanized as Chahār Cheshmeh and Chehār Chashmeh; also known as Chahār Chashmeh-ye Nāz̧em and Qal‘eh-ye Zakī) is a village in Chahar Cheshmeh Rural District, Kamareh District, Khomeyn County, Markazi Province, Iran. At the 2006 census, its population was 831, in 209 families.

References 

Populated places in Khomeyn County